James Wells Gair (December 27, 1927 – December 10, 2016) was an American linguist who specialized in the languages of South Asia. He is best known for his work on Sinhala, much of which was done in collaboration with W. S. Karunatillake. Other languages on which he worked include Pali, Tamil, and Dhivehi.

Works

On Sinhala

On Pali

References

1927 births
2016 deaths
Cornell University faculty
Linguists from the United States
Linguists of Pali